The cantons of Clermont-Ferrand are administrative divisions of the Puy-de-Dôme department, in central France. Since the French canton reorganisation which came into effect in March 2015, the city of Clermont-Ferrand is subdivided into 6 cantons. Their seat is in Clermont-Ferrand.

Cantons

References

Cantons of Puy-de-Dôme